Vokesinotus perrugatus is a species of sea snail, a marine gastropod mollusk in the family Muricidae, the murex snails or rock snails.

Description
The length of the shell attains 28 mm.

Distribution
This marine species occurs off Florida, USA.

References

 Petuch, E. J. (2013). Biogeography and biodiversity of western Atlantic mollusks. CRC Press. 252 pp.

External links
 Herbert G.S., Pio M.J., Pastorino G., Harasewych M.G., Kantor Yu.I., Lamy D. & Pointier J.-P. (2015). Morphological development of the radula of four species of the neogastropod family Muricidae. Malacologia. 58(1-2): 323-336

perrugatus
Gastropods described in 1846